The Second Hannibal Bridge is a rail bridge over the Missouri River in Kansas City, Missouri, connecting Jackson County, Missouri, with Clay County, Missouri.

There are two decks on the bridge: the lower deck carried the railroad and the upper was for vehicular traffic. After the Buck O'Neil Bridge opened in 1956, vehicular traffic was switched over to the new span and the auto deck was removed later that year. The bridge is owned and maintained by the BNSF Railway and carries two tracks. A bridge tender at the bridge can open and close the drawspan as well as operate the nearby ASB Bridge, which is also owned by BNSF.

The Hannibal Bridge survived the 1951 Kansas City flood after being hit by four river boats that tore loose from the mouth of the Kansas River, forcing the swinging span open.

See also
List of crossings of the Missouri River

References

Bridges in Kansas City, Missouri
Bridges completed in 1917
BNSF Railway bridges
Chicago, Burlington and Quincy Railroad
Bridges over the Missouri River
Buildings and structures in Clay County, Missouri
Railroad bridges in Missouri
Road-rail bridges in the United States
Road bridges in Missouri